Constellations is a two-hander play by the British playwright Nick Payne.

Plot summary
The play follows Roland, a beekeeper, and Marianne, a physicist, through their romantic relationship. Marianne often waxes poetic about cosmology, quantum mechanics, string theory and the belief that there are multiple universes that pull people's lives in various directions. This is reflected in the play's structure as brief scenes are repeated, often with different outcomes.

Roland and Marianne meet at a barbecue and become romantically involved. After they've moved in together, a confession of infidelity causes them to break up. After some time, they run in to each other at a ballroom dancing class, resume their relationship, and eventually marry. Marianne begins to forget words and has trouble typing. She is told by her doctor that she has a tumor in her frontal lobe and has less than a year to live. She eventually seeks assisted suicide abroad with Roland's support. The play ends with a flashback to the scene where Roland and Marianne rekindle their relationship in the dance class.

Productions

2012 London premiere 
Constellations premiered at the Royal Court Theatre in January 2012, with Rafe Spall and Sally Hawkins in the lead roles and direction by Michael Longhurst. The play received strong reviews from critics and subsequently transferred to the Duke of York's Theatre in the West End in November 2012. The reviewer for The Guardian wrote "For all its teasing razzle-dazzle, though, it is the human warmth of the writing and acting that ensures the play never slides into tricksiness."

In November 2012 Constellations was named the winner of the best play category at the Evening Standard Theatre Awards, making the 29-year-old Payne the youngest winner of the award. It also received several nominations at the 2013 Olivier Awards.

2015 Broadway production 
The play premiered on Broadway in a Manhattan Theatre Club production at the Samuel J. Friedman Theatre on January 13, 2015 and closed on 15 March 2015. The cast starred Jake Gyllenhaal (in his Broadway debut) and Ruth Wilson. Ruth Wilson received a nomination for the 2015 Tony Award, Best Performance By a Leading Actress in a Play. The play received three Drama League Award nominations: Best Play, Best Actor, Gyllenhaal, and Best Actress, Wilson.

2021 West End revival 
Constellations received a West End revival at the Vaudeville Theatre from June to September 2021, produced by the Donmar Warehouse. The production featured four casts in rotation: Sheila Atim and Ivanno Jeremiah, Peter Capaldi and Zoë Wanamaker, Omari Douglas and Russell Tovey, and Anna Maxwell Martin and Chris O'Dowd. Longhurst returned to direct the play, which was revised by Payne to accommodate Douglas and Tovey as characters Roland and Manuel. The production won the 2022 Olivier Awards for Best Revival and Best Actress for Atim, and received nominations for Best Director and Best Actor for Douglas.

Other productions 
The play toured the UK, starting in May 2015 at Woking's New Victoria Theatre.

In 2022 the Hawaiian premiere was produced by the KOA Theater opening June 17th. The show was directed by Kevin Keaveney and starred Chris Jaymes and Eden Lee.

A production opened on February 10, 2016 at the Boise Contemporary Theater in Boise, ID, running through March 5, and starring Dwayne Blackaller and Tiara Thompson and directed by Tracy Sunderland.

In January 2013 Payne revealed that a film adaptation was under way. That plan has since been shelved.

In 2016 the Canadian English-language premiere was co-produced by Montreal's Centaur Theatre and Toronto’s Canadian Stage Company. The show was directed by legendary Canadian director Peter Hinton and starred Cara Ricketts and Graham Cuthbertson.

The 2016 Studio Theatre production was nominated for 6 awards at the 2017 Helen Hayes Awards in Washington, D.C. The production won 2 awards, with Tom Patterson receiving the Robert Prosky Award for Outstanding Lead Actor in a Play and Lily Balatincz receiving Outstanding Lead Actress in a Play.

The play premiered in Los Angeles at the Geffen Playhouse with Ginnifer Goodwin and Allen Leech and director Giovanna Sardelli.

The play premiered in Perth, Western Australia in June 2018 with Paul Davey and Madelaine Page and directed by Brendan Ellis.

In November 2015, the Chinese-language premiere was directed and translated by Wang Chong in Beijing. He used 13 on stage cameras to conceptualize the play into a "stage movie" with the 50 scenes presented in 50 takes creating a very intimate cinematic experience. A real hamster was also on the stage representing the god of time and universe dictating the cuts of the "movie" and the possibilities of life. Because of the show's success, the actress Wang Xiaohuan was recognised by The Beijing News as The Young Theater Artist of the Year.

In December 2021, the play was staged by the Owl & Nightingale Players in Gettysburg, Pennsylvania, featuring Casey Creagh as Marianne and Eric Lippe as Roland. Creagh won the Capstone Award awarded by the local Gettysburg College.

In November 2022 a production was staged at The Garage, Bangkok by the Bangkok Community Theatre, featuring Nicholas Burnham and Fiona Haque, directed by Danny Wall. The production took place at ‘The Garage’ in Bangkok, Thailand. In the same month, the play was also presented at The Pegg Studio in Bristol by Bristol Drama Society, featuring Elsa Cleaver, Andrew Graham, Honey Gawn-Hopkins & Lilly Walker. The production was directed by Holly Bancroft and Kate Hunter.

In February 2023, a production was staged at the Barn Theatre, Welwyn Garden City. The production was directed by Coral Walton, and starred Kelsey Cooke and Steve Deaville.

In April 2023, a new production of the play, directed by Wesley Henderson Roe, will be presented at Hampton Hill Theatre in Hampton, England, starring Brendan Leddy and Heather Stockwell.

Publication
Several versions of the play have been published in the United Kingdom and the United States.

References

2012 plays
English plays
Two-handers